Adityana is a census town in Porbandar district in the India in state of  Gujarat. It is located near Barda hills.

History
The town was founded in 1748.

Caves
In the hill to the east of the village is a large cave called the cave of Jambuvan. Jambuvan is an Indian epic character whose daughter Jambuvati married Krishna.

Economy
In 1839 a quarry was started here in the hills to the north-east of the village. This stone is largely exported to Bombay and elsewhere and is commercially known as Porbandar stone. It is a limestone, yellowish white in colour, and of compact grain. Locally it is known as makhanio patthar or butter-stone. It is said to possess one excellent quality; walls are built of this cut-stone without any mortar, and it is said that after one rainy season the stones all adhere together so as to form one block.

Demographics
 India census, Aadityana had a population of 17,237. Males constituted 52% of the population and females 48%. The average literacy rate was 53%, lower than the national average of 59.5%; with 60% of the males and 40% of females literate. 16% of the population was under 6 years of age.

References

 This article incorporates text from a publication now in the public domain: 

Cities and towns in Porbandar district